Shaft Katuka (born 31 March 1979) is a retired Zambian football midfielder.

References

1979 births
Living people
Zambian footballers
Zambia international footballers
Red Arrows F.C. players
Young Arrows F.C. players
Association football midfielders